The name Kevin has been used for nine tropical cyclones worldwide: seven in the Eastern Pacific Ocean, and one each in the Australian region and the South Pacific.

In the Eastern Pacific:
 Tropical Storm Kevin (1985)
 Hurricane Kevin (1991)
 Tropical Storm Kevin (1997)
 Tropical Storm Kevin (2003)
 Tropical Storm Kevin (2009)
 Tropical Storm Kevin (2015)
 Tropical Storm Kevin (2021)

In the Australian region:
 Cyclone Kevin (1979)

In the South Pacific:
 Cyclone Kevin (2023)

Pacific hurricane set index articles
Australian region cyclone set index articles
South Pacific cyclone set index articles